Božena Dobešová (October 2, 1914 – November 28, 1990) was a Czechoslovak gymnast who competed in the 1936 Summer Olympics.

In 1936 she won the silver medal as member of the Czechoslovak gymnastics team.

External links
 profile

1914 births
1990 deaths
Czechoslovak female artistic gymnasts
Olympic gymnasts of Czechoslovakia
Gymnasts at the 1936 Summer Olympics
Olympic silver medalists for Czechoslovakia
Olympic medalists in gymnastics
Medalists at the 1936 Summer Olympics